Trichocalyx orbiculatus is a species of plant in the family Acanthaceae. It is endemic to Yemen.  Its natural habitats are subtropical or tropical dry forests and subtropical or tropical dry shrubland.

References

Endemic flora of Socotra
orbiculatus
Data deficient plants
Taxonomy articles created by Polbot
Taxa named by Isaac Bayley Balfour